Hippeophyllum is a genus of flowering plants from the orchid family, Orchidaceae. It is native to New Guinea, insular Southeast Asia, and the Solomon Islands.

Hippeophyllum alboviride J.J.Sm. - New Guinea
Hippeophyllum biakenae J.J.Sm. - New Guinea
Hippeophyllum celebicum Schltr. - Sulawesi
Hippeophyllum halmaherense J.J.Sm. - Halmahera
Hippeophyllum hamadryas (Ridl.) Schltr. in K.M.Schumann & C.A.G.Lauterbach - New Guinea
Hippeophyllum micranthum Schltr. in K.M.Schumann & C.A.G.Lauterbach - New Guinea, Solomon Islands
Hippeophyllum papillosum Schltr. - New Guinea
Hippeophyllum scortechinii (Hook.f.) Schltr. - Borneo, Java, Malaysia, Sulawesi, Sumatra 
Hippeophyllum sulense J.J.Sm. - Sula Islands in Maluku
Hippeophyllum wenzelii Ames - Leyte

See also 
 List of Orchidaceae genera

References 

 Pridgeon, A.M., Cribb, P.J., Chase, M.A. & Rasmussen, F. eds. (1999). Genera Orchidacearum 1. Oxford Univ. Press.
 Pridgeon, A.M., Cribb, P.J., Chase, M.A. & Rasmussen, F. eds. (2001). Genera Orchidacearum 2. Oxford Univ. Press.
 Pridgeon, A.M., Cribb, P.J., Chase, M.A. & Rasmussen, F. eds. (2003). Genera Orchidacearum 3. Oxford Univ. Press
 Berg Pana, H. 2005. Handbuch der Orchideen-Namen. Dictionary of Orchid Names. Dizionario dei nomi delle orchidee. Ulmer, Stuttgart

Malaxideae genera
Malaxidinae